Tingis cardui  is a Palearctic lacewing bug. The species is widespread in almost all of Europe and lacking only in the far North. It is common also in North Africa and East Asia minor and the Middle East as well as southern  Russia and the Caucasus to Siberia and the North of China.
Tingis cardui  lives on Cirsium, in particular on Cirsium vulgare, but also on Cirsium palustre and less frequently on Carduus nutans, Carduus crispus, and Carduus acanthoides. Overwintering occurs as an imago in the ground litter, or under loose bark. The bugs appear in April or May, and sit on the basal leaves of their food crops.

Some make dispersion flights to colonize new plants. Mating and oviposition lasts until July. The females drill their eggs individually on both sides of the leaves into the tissue of the food plant. The nymphs occur from June until September. Older nymphs are often located between the spines on the  outside of the flower baskets or close to it. The adult animals of the new generation occur from late July or early August.

References

 E. Wachmann, A. Melber & J. Deckert: Wanzen. Band 1: Neubearbeitung der Wanzen Deutschlands, Österreichs und der deutschsprachigen Schweiz, Goecke & Evers, Keltern, 2006. .

Hemiptera of Europe
Tingidae
Insects described in 1758
Taxa named by Carl Linnaeus